John Boyle (born 1 November 1934) is an Australian wrestler. He competed in the men's freestyle welterweight at the 1964 Summer Olympics.

References

1934 births
Living people
Australian male sport wrestlers
Olympic wrestlers of Australia
Wrestlers at the 1964 Summer Olympics
Place of birth missing (living people)